"Vie mut kotiin" ("Take Me Home") is the first single by Finnish singer Jesse Kaikuranta from his similarly titled debut album Vie mut kotiin. It was released as a single on 24 April 2012.  The accompanying music video was uploaded to YouTube on 4 June 2012.

Chart performance 

"Vie mut kotiin" peaked at number one on the Official Finnish Download Chart and at number 11 on the Finnish Singles Chart.

Chart performance

References

2012 debut singles
Finnish-language songs
Jesse Kaikuranta songs
2012 songs
Universal Music Group singles